The Church of Our Lord, built in 1866-1870 and is located at 626 Blanshard Street in Victoria, British Columbia, Canada, is an historic Carpenter Gothic church that is designated as a National Historic Site of Canada. It has been affiliated with the Reformed Episcopal Church since its beginning, which became a member of the Anglican Church in North America, upon its creation in 2009.

See also
List of historic places in Victoria, British Columbia

References

External links

 Church of Our Lord website
 Recognition as National Historic Site
 

Heritage sites in British Columbia
Anglican Church in North America church buildings in Canada
Carpenter Gothic church buildings in British Columbia
Churches in Victoria, British Columbia
National Historic Sites in British Columbia
Tourist attractions in Victoria, British Columbia
Churches on the National Historic Sites of Canada register